You Can Always Turn Around is a studio album by the American musician Lucky Peterson, released in 2010. It won the Grand Prix du Disque award the same year for the best blues album.

Track listing

Personnel
Musicians
Lucky Peterson – Arranger, Guitar (Acoustic), Guitar (Electric), National Duolian, Piano, Producer, Vocals
Larry Campbell (musician) – Arranger, Guitar (Acoustic), Mandolin, National Duolian, Pedal Steel
Gary Burke - Arranger, Drums
Scott Petito - Arranger, Bass, Engineer, Mastering, Mixing, Octave Mandolin, Shaker
Tamara Peterson - Vocals (8, 10)
Doug Yoel - Arranger, Cover Photo, Liner Notes, Photography, Producer, Selection
Francis Dreyfus - Producer
Beth Reineke - Assistant Engineer, Inside Photo
Valérie Lefebvre - Package Coordinator
Djémila Boukhlifa - Package Coordinator

Awards and nominations
Winner - Grand Prix du Disque - Best Blues Album (2010, FRANCE)
Nominee - Blues Music Award - Best Acoustic Blues Album (2011, USA)

2010 albums